Aphrocallistidae is a family of hexactinellid sponges in the order Sceptrulophora.

Genera 
There are two genera in Aphrocallistidae. 
Aphrocallistes Gray, 1858
Heterochone Ijima, 1927

References

External links
 http://www.godac.jamstec.go.jp/bismal/j/view/0000753  Biological Information System for Marine Life (BISMaL)

Hexactinellida
Sponge families